Pasiphila hyrcanica is a moth in the family Geometridae. It was described by Jaan Viidalepp and Vladimir Mironov in 2006. It is found in Azerbaijan and Iran.

Adults have been recorded on wing from mid-May to late June.

The larvae possibly feed on the flower buds or flowers of Prunus or Crataegus species.

Etymology
The species name is derived from that of the Hyrcanian biogeographical province.

References

hyrcanica
Moths described in 2006
Moths of the Middle East
Insects of Azerbaijan
Endemic fauna of Iran
Endemic fauna of Azerbaijan